Caprichthys gymnura, also known as the Rigid boxfish, is a species of deepwater boxfish native to the waters of the continental shelf off the western and southern coasts of Australia. It is found at depths from 40 to 200 meters (130 to 660 feet).  This species grows to a length of 11 centimeters (4.3 inches) TL. This species is the only known member of its genus.

References

Aracanidae
Fish described in 1915
Fish of Australia
Taxa named by Allan Riverstone McCulloch
Taxa named by Edgar Ravenswood Waite